Lindsley Avenue Church of Christ is a historic church at 3 Lindsley Avenue in Nashville, Tennessee. It was built in 1894 and added to the National Register in 1984. It is across the road from the Nashville Children's Theatre.

The Church was founded by David Lipscomb. Dr. Ira North was formerly a minister and eventually moved to the Madison Church of Christ. Laws Rushing II was minister for nearly a decade.

Gene Wright is the current minister of the Church. The congregation celebrates a homecoming service on the second Sunday of October every year.

References

External links
Church website

Churches on the National Register of Historic Places in Tennessee
Gothic Revival church buildings in Tennessee
Churches completed in 1894
19th-century churches in the United States
Churches in Nashville, Tennessee
Churches of Christ
National Register of Historic Places in Nashville, Tennessee